Festivals in Nigeria, some of which dates back to the period before the arrival of the major religions in her ethnically and culturally diverse society. The christian festivals and Islam festivals are often celebrated in ways that are unique to Nigeria or unique to the people of a locality.
The Nigerian Tourism Development Corporation has been working with the states to bring more awareness and significance to the traditional festivals, which may become important sources of tourism revenue. There are more than 365 festivals in Nigeria according to the Minister of Information and Culture, Mr Lai Mohammed and government is working hard to harness these festivals as a way of showcasing and boosting the country's diverse cultures.

List of festivals in Nigeria

Book festivals
Port Harcourt Book Festival
Lagos Book and Art Festival (LABAF)
Kaduna Book And Art Festival (KABAFEST)
Aké Arts and Book Festival
Nigeria International Book Fair (NIBF)

Film festivals in Nigeria

Abuja International Film Festival
Africa International Film Festival (film)
Eko International Film Festival (film)
Kaduna International Film Festival (film)
African Smartphone International Film Festival (film)
Lights, Camera, Africa!

Music festivals in Nigeria

Baràà Ma Jalàm Festival
Calabar Carnival  
Carniriv
Felabration 
Gidi Culture Festival
Kamti Festival
Star Mega Jam
Nupe Day Festival
Rhythm Unplugged
Lagos International Jazz Festival (LIJF)
Livespot X Festival

Cultural festivals in Nigeria

Omabe Festival
Afan National Festival
The Afro Street Festival
Njuwa Fishing Festival
Nwonyo Fishing Festival
Ikeji Arondizuogu Festival
Agila Social and Economic Carnival 
Akata Benue Fishing Festival
Annang Festival of Art and Culture
Argungu Fishing Festival 
Ovia-Osese Festival
Ayet Atyap annual cultural festival
Ariginya Festival
Badagry Festival 
Bala Baràà ma Jalàm cultural festival
Bauchi State Festival of Arts and Culture
Carniriv 
Durbar festival 
Osun-Osogbo 
Eyo festival 
FESTAC 77
Golibe Festival
Kaiama Gani Festival
Gidi Culture Festival 
Igogo Festival 
Igue Festival 
Imo Carnival
Sharo Festival
Imo Awka festival
Ikeji Arondizuogu
ijakadi Festival common to the people of offa town 
Iromo Festival in Igede Ekiti
Lagos Black Heritage Festival 
Leboku 
Nupe Day Festival
Kayo-Kayo Festival
Ofala Festival 
Ogwashi Ukwu Carnival
Ojude Oba festival 
Olojo Festival 
Oro Festival 
Lagos Carnival 
Unyeada fishing festival
Osori Osos
Oronna Festival
Sango Festival  
 Songs of Nigeria Festival (SONIFES)
Yam Festival
 New Yam Festivals in Nigeria
Ocho Festival
Ogani Festival Common to the Igala people of Kogi state specifically those from Ankpa axis
Ito Ogbo festival
Mmanwu Festival 
Ijele Festival

Other
Lagos Games Festival (LGF)
Lagos Photo Festival
Mr Hobby Appreciation Festival
Potiskum Writers Association Schools Festival (POWASFEST)
Tiger Street Food Festival

Book festivals

Port Harcourt Book Festival 

The Port Harcourt Book Festival is an annual literary event in Port Harcourt, Rivers State, Nigeria, organized by the Rainbow Book Club and endorsed by the Rivers State Government since 2008. The Garden City Literary Festival, which is currently known as the Port Harcourt Book Festival was founded by Governor Amaechi of Rivers State, Hundreds of literary fans flock to the Garden City every year for this six-day event, which includes a book fair, writers' workshops, and a variety of other activities. In the past the Festival has been attended by recognized authors and has hosted a number of celebrities.

The festival began as the brainchild of Koko Kalango, who thought it up as a means to propel tourism numbers and heighten literacy awareness in the city of Port Harcourt and its neighboring areas. Originally scheduled for 8 September each year, to coincide with United Nations' International Literacy Day, the festival has continued to expand and has been highly rated since its debut.

Lagos Book and Art Festival (LABAF) 

The Lagos Book and Art Festival (LABAF) is an annual arts festival founded in 1999 by the Committee for Relevant Art (CORA), a Nigerian-based cultural organisation. LABAF features a number of different activities including pre-festival activities like book treks and other major festival activities including musical performances, book readings, film screenings, a publishers’ forum], book and art exhibitions, panel discussions, colloquiums, symposiums, book presentations, cultural exhibitions, book reviews, a green festival and more events. The festival also enables the participation of students of primary and secondary schools and universities in Nigeria by introducing competition and mentoring opportunities for them. The festival also selects different books yearly that are featured as Books of the Festival and form part of the festival's discourse for that year.

Kaduna Book And Art Festival (KABAFEST) 

Kaduna Book and Arts Festival, also known as KABAFEST, is an annual literary, cultural, and art event in Kaduna State, Nigeria that took place for the first time in July, 2017. It was organized by Book Buzz Foundation, who also organizes the annual Aké Arts and Book Festival, in collaboration with the Kaduna State Government and the Gusau Institute. It was also the first book festival that occurs annually in northern Nigeria. There is a perception about Northern Nigeria as a place that is too conservative for books and literature. KABAFEST was conceived - an initiative of the Kaduna State Government, as a way to address that misconception. Of that founding, Lola Shoneyin of Book Buzz says through the festival, she "aim to create new and exciting opportunities for social and cultural interaction, the celebration and promotion of creatives in the Northern region of Nigeria and foster tolerance and understanding through dialogues about books, culture, the arts and society."

Aké Arts and Book Festival 

The Aké Arts and Book Festival is an annual literary, cultural and arts event that was founded in 2013 by the Nigerian writer Lola Shoneyin, taking place in Abeokuta, Nigeria. Although it has featured new and established writers from across the world, its focus has been to promote, develop and celebrate creativity on the African continent in diverse genres. In 2018 the festival was held for the first time in Lagos, from 24 October to 27 October, with the theme being "Fantastical Futures". The Aké Arts and Book Festival has been described as the African continent's biggest annual gathering of literary writers, editors, critics and readers. Shoneyin started the festival because, according to her, she "wanted a place where intellectuals and thinkers can come together and talk about African issues on African soil." The festival is named after Aké, a town in Abeokuta, Ogun State, where Africa's first Nobel Laureate in Literature, Wole Soyinka, was born in 1934.

Nigeria International Book Fair 

The Nigeria International Book Fair (NIBF) is an annual cultural event in the republic of Nigeria. It is known to be the most attended book fair in the whole of Africa, being the only international book fair in Nigeria and the second largest international book fair in Africa. NIBF brings together book enthusiasts such as writers and poet that are generally involved in the creation of print, audio and digital books all over the country at her annual fair.

The main aim of the festival is to promote and improve the reading culture among Nigerians and Africans as a whole. Every second week of May annually, the NIBF hosts publishers, booksellers, illustrators, authors, exhibitors and readers who displays and sell their books at discounted prices.

The Nigeria International Book Fair was inaugurated in 2001. The chairman of the event is also known to be the chairman of Nigerian Book Fair Trust, who currently is Gbadega Adedapo.

Film festivals

Africa International Film Festival 

The Africa International Film Festival (AFRIFF) is an annual film festival that takes place in Nigeria. It was founded in 2010 with its Inaugural edition in Port Harcourt, Rivers State, Nigeria. AFRIFF was founded by Chioma Ude a passionate film buff and entrepreneur, The event normally spans through a week and it includes award shows and film training classes. Keith Shiri, the founder/director of Africa at the Pictures is the artistic director of the festival. AFRIFF gives out honors in categories such Feature, Documentary, Short, Animation, and Students Short, as well as awards and prizes for Directing, Acting, and Screenplay. There are additional special awards for Audience Choice and an Outstanding Film Jury Award.

Eko International Film Festival 

The annual Eko International Film Festival (EKOIFF) is an international film festival held in Lagos, Nigeria. The Eko International Film Festival was founded and established in 2009 by Hope Obioma Opara, the CEO of Supple Communications Limited, under which the festival is held. He is also the publisher of Supple magazine, an African cinema and culture journal that features film previews, reviews, and interviews. The purpose of the Eko International Film Festival is to develop tourism in Nigeria by promoting appreciation of the arts and culture through the motion picture arts and sciences.

Lights, Camera, Africa! 

Lights, Camera, Africa! is a film festival which has been held annually in Lagos since 2011. The festival was established by Ugoma Adegoke. Hosted by The Life House, the inaugural Lights, Camera, Africa! was supported by New York's African Film Festival, Inc. and ran for three days, from 30 September – 2 October 2011.

Music festivals

Felabration 

Felabration is an annual music festival conceived in 1998 by Yeni Anikulapo-Kuti in memory and celebration of her father Fela Kuti, a Nigerian musician and human rights activist known for pioneering the afrobeat genre of music. The one-week-long event which is held annually at the New Afrika Shrine in Ikeja, attracts visitors from different countries and has thus been considered as an official tourist destination by the Lagos State Government.

Felabration is held on the week of Fela Kuti birthday. The event features musical performances from top music acts from Nigeria and guest appearances from internationally acclaimed musicians and personalities. It also consists of street parades, symposia on social and topical issues, debates and photo exhibitions. The festival had legendary performances from Star acts like Third World: an international reggae group, 2face, Femi Kuti, Ice Prince and a surprise performance by Majek Fashek.

Lagos International Jazz Festival 

The Lagos International Jazz Festival (LIJF), also known as Lagos Jazz Fest, is an annual celebration of jazz music and culture that was founded by Ayoola Shadare of Inspiro Productions and takes place in Lagos.

This music festival is three days event. The 2016 edition was divided into a two-day standard edition which was held at the Freedom Park, Lagos and then a 0ne day luxury edition which took place at The Bay Lounge Waterfront.

Rhythm Unplugged 

Rhythm Unplugged is a music concert in West Africa. CEO of the Flytime Group, Cecil Hammond, organised the first concert in 2004. The annual concert is organised by Flytime Promotions, a subsidiary of the Flytime Group. The 2011 Lagos edition of Rhythm Unplugged unveiled artists including Wizkid, Olamide, Davido, Tiwa Savage and Seyi Shay.

Rhythm Unplugged concerts featured dialoguing co-hosts, notably, co-hosts Julius Agwu and Okey Bakassi, who hosted several Flytime Promotions events in the early years. Rhythm Unplugged also pioneered the extensive artist line-up for single concert events in Nigeria. Rhythm Unplugged was first organised by Cecil Hammond in 2004 via his company Flytime Promotions. The entertainment event was designed to promote Nigerian musicians and comedians at a time when the Nigerian music industry was just gaining recognition on the international music scene.

Nupe Cultural Day 

The Nupe Day Celebration is a traditional and cultural event or celebration observed in Nigeria on the 26th of June. The event is ordinarily celebrated by the Nupe community yearly in the country. The Nupe day event is a traditional and festival celebration, which marks the day when the British Army was defeated by a native African Army on the 26 June 1896, when the British Protectorate in Lokoja approached the Bida Military camp at Ogidi of present Kogi State which bring the resulting of the defeated of British Constabulary and the Union Jack was seized by the Nupe Cavalry. The annual celebration was the founding idea of the Nupe elders through the tribes, Unlike the Durbar festival and the Pategi Ragatta boating festival which is also among Nupe event and Northern Nigeria traditional event.

Star Mega Jam 

The Star Mega Jam was a series of music concerts in Nigeria held annually from 2000 to 2010. Each year it was held in Lagos and Abuja. Acts that played included Awilo Logomba, Shaggy, Usher, Koffi Olumide, 50 Cent, Ja Rule and Kevin Lyttle, LL Cool J and Akon, Kanye West, T-Pain, Nelly, Nas, Busta Rhymes and Ludacris. Thus festival however was stopped in 2011, with the organisers stating that it was due to logistical challenges.

Gidi Culture Festival 

The Gidi Culture Festival (often dubbed Coachella in Lagos) is an annual one-day music and arts festival that takes place in Lagos, Nigeria. Co-founded by Chinedu Okeke and Oriteme Banigo, it was created in response to a demand from the local youth culture for live, affordable, and accessible entertainment in Africa. The festival provides a venue for live bands, DJs, and musical acts to perform. It also features outdoor activities, local vendors, and artisans. The main show features a line-up of African acts from numerous countries, including Nigeria, Ghana, South Africa, Congo, Kenya, and the United Kingdom. The goal of the festival is to encourage the development of African talent and promote artists both within the continent and into overseas markets.

Livespot X Festival 

Livespot X Festival is an annual music concert that launched in 2019 with its maiden edition in Lagos, Nigeria and Accra, Ghana. The concert is organized by Livespot 360 ownwed by Deola Art Alade. The 2019 edition of Livespot X Festival unveiled artists including Cardi B, Teni, Burna boy, Tiwa Savage, Seyi Shay, Joeboy, Ice Prince, DJ Cuppy, Reekado Banks, and Patoranking which was held in Lagos and Ghana.

Livespot X Festival featured a fusion of incredible live performances; music, impressive lighting, special acts, and immersive experiences, all rolled into one high-octane event.

Christian festivals
Christians account for about 50% of the Nigerian population, living throughout the country but predominantly in the south.
The main Christian festivals are Christmas and Easter. The way in which these holidays are celebrated often incorporates traditions from earlier religions.

Christmas is held on 25 December each year to celebrate the birth of Jesus Christ. 
It is a public holiday in Nigeria.
In Igboland, in addition to a church service and distribution of gifts the festivities may include Mmo (masquerade) dancing, where men in their twenties or thirties dress in colorful costumes and wear masks. These masquerades, which pre-date the introduction of Christianity, honor the ancestral spirits.
In some areas, palm branches are hung inside and outside the houses, signs of peace and symbols of Christmas.
Easter is held to commemorate the crucification of Jesus Christ on Good Friday and to celebrate his resurrection three days later on Easter Sunday.
It is a public holiday in Nigeria.
Easter usually occurs in April.
Easter Sunday is a joyful occasion, celebrated with feasting, dancing, drumming, and sometimes with public masquerades and dancers. Majorly, a fasting exercise comes ahead of the Easter celebration which is known as the Lent. Although, it is not been practice  by all denomination(s) i.e. only some denomination gives full regard to it.

Christmas and Easter may be times of heightened tension between Christians and Muslims in some areas.
On Christmas Eve in 2010 at least 38 people were killed, including shoppers and church attendees.
Members of the extreme Islamist sect Boko Haram were blamed for several incidents.
Some reports placed the death toll as high as 80.
In 2011, Easter occurred just after elections in which Goodluck Jonathan, a southerner and Christian, had been elected president. Churches were burned in some parts of northern Nigeria, and some Christians were killed in post-election violence.

Muslim festivals

About half of the population of Nigeria  adhere to the Muslim religion, with Muslims living throughout the country but particularly in the north. 39% are Muslims 50% are Christians and 11% percent are other practiced religions 
There are two main Muslim festivals, Eid Al Fitri and Eid Al Kabir, all national public holidays.
The different ethnic groups in different locations have the same way for celebrating these festivals.

The three-day festival of Eid Al Fitri celebrates the end of the holy month of Ramadan, a period of fasting from dawn to dusk each day.
The festival is a time to give charity to the poor, and to celebrate the completion of Ramadan with family and friends.

Eid al Kabir (known as Eid al-Adha elsewhere), or "Festival of Sacrifice", is an important religious holiday celebrated by Muslims worldwide to commemorate the willingness of Abraham (ʾIbrāhīm) to sacrifice his son Ishmael (Ismā'īl) as an act of obedience to God, before God intervened to provide him with a ram to sacrifice instead. A ram, goat, sheep, cow or camel is sacrificed, with the family eating part of the animal and donating the rest to the poor. The festival is celebrated on the tenth day of Dhu al-Hijjah, the last month in the Islamic calendar.

Durbar festivals are celebrated at the culmination of Eid al-Fitr and Eid al-Adha. Durbars have been held for hundreds of years in the northern states, notably the Daura Emirate, and gave an opportunity for conscripts to the army to display their skills as horsemen. In modern times, durbars are held in honor of visiting heads of state. They include a parade, shows and competitions. The horsemen are dressed in vividly colored costumes, with period weapons, and are accompanied by a drum corps and musicians.
Modern Durbar festivals include prayers at the start of the day, followed by parades in town squares or in front of the local emir's palace. Horsemanship is still the main focus. Each group must gallop at full tilt past the Emir, then halt and salute him with raised swords. 
Durbar festivals are being developed as important tourist attractions. Due to the presence of COVID-19 in most parts of the country, some northern states decided to put off the durbar celebrations to curtail the spread of the virus since the celebrations always attract a number of guests and spectators with little or no adherence to COVID-19 safety protocols.

Kayo-Kayo Festival 

The Kayo-Kayo festival is a yearly religious and cultural state event held by the descendants of Oba Kosoko to commemorate King Kosoko's historic landing in Epe in 1851. The Epe community of Lagos State is known for Kayo-Kayo, which literally means "eating to satisfaction." The festival is commemorated on the 10th day of Muharram in the Islamic calendar, which is about a month after the Muslim celebration of Eid-El-Kabir, and is normally held in the first month of the Islamic calendar.

Other Important festivals

Afan National Festival

The Afan National Festival is annually held in the town of Kagoro in the southern part of Kaduna State, Nigeria on the 1st of January at the Chief of Kagoro's palace field with many cultural displays by troops from within the township, its vicinity and across the Middle Belt of the country. It is said to have been active for over 400 years. The festival is always held as a celebration of the bravity and gallancy of a hunter named Katagwan who was said to be known for his great hunting skills and exploits.

Argungu Fishing Festival

 The Argungu Fishing Festival is an annual four-day festival in the town of Argungu in the north-western Nigerian state of Kebbi. It began in the year 1934, as a mark of the end of the centuries-old hostility between the Sokoto Caliphate and the Kebbi Kingdom. The festival is held on the Sokoto river in February or March. Thousand of fishermen equipped only with nets compete to catch the largest fish. Other attractions include dance and music, sporting competitions and exhibits of arts and crafts. People from various parts of the world come to see or look at this festival. The festival is believed to have started after the historic peace visit by the then 16th Sultan of Sokoto, Alhaji Hassan Dan Mu'azu. It is believed that the prayers of the Sultan during his visit after he was treated to a reception of a big fish made the argungu waters fertile and special which then lead to yearly commemoration of the Sultans visit.

Ikeji Arondizuogu

Ikeji cultural festival of Arondizuogu in Imo State is a popular festival that brings the Igbo speaking community around the world together. Its origin dates back to over five centuries and it is acclaimed as the biggest pan-Igbo cultural community festival with strong heritage, international recognition and is witnessed by thousands of people on a yearly basis. It is arguably the biggest cultural festival in Igboland. In contemporary times, each passing year has witnessed an increase in grandeur, display, dance, sophistication and an all-inclusive participation of all Arondizuogu people and friends. The festival is marked with colourful display of different masquerades such as Ogionu, Mgbadike, Nwaaburuja and Ozoebune; prestigiously parading across the market square to the admiration of the public. The essence of the festival, which ranks among the best surviving traditional ceremonies of the Arondizuogu people, is to celebrate the harvest of the first yams. It serves to unify and foster ties among Aro people who are spread across the entire Igbo speaking states and part of Cross River state. It appeals to the entire Igbo speaking peoples both at home and in the Diaspora.

Ikeji is a four-day festival of propitiation, thanksgiving and feasting which is held annually in March or April. Reckoned with the Igbo calendar, these four days correspond to one Igbo week of four market days (Eke, Oye/Orie, Afo and Nkwo). Each of these days has a special significance and represents one of the several dimensions of Ikeji – a festival renowned for sumptuous feasting, fascinating masquerades, pulsating rhythms, and colourful performances. Traditional musical instruments used to accompany the masquerades are ekwe (wooden slit drum) of various sizes, ogene (metal gong), bells, maracas and oja (wooden flutes). The flutist is a very important element in the ikeji festival. He deftly communicates with the masquerades - weaving soulful melodies and blending esoteric messages into the intoxicating rhythm of the drums. Another interesting aspect of ikeji is the raconteur known as ima mbem - an imaginative tale delivered with a musical cadence that only the initiated can sometimes understand or comprehend. The importance of the flutist during Ikeji festival is very vital, for he communicates things hidden from the ordinary eyes to the masquerades, combined with soulful melodies, steps and gestures, “blending esoteric messages into the intoxicating rhythm of the drums” to the admiration of the crowd.

During Ikeji festival, on the last day, a ram is usually tied to a pole at a popular market square with a single thread. Somebody with the strongest protection from any juju of whatever type is expected to leisurely walk to the ram amids heavy attempt with juju from other people to knock him down, maim him or kill him. Only the brave can participate in, while the not so brave will either abstain from or remain with the crowd as spectators. Only the brave can stand forward from the crowd, one after another and approach the tree with a view to untying the ram. However, each contender will be attacked by forces which are beyond the scope of this article to explain, with a view to stopping him reaching the ram. If overwhelmed, he will beat a retreat back to his starting point. Until eventually, the bravest among the masquerades participating in the competition for that year's festival, after overcoming all odds, will reach the ram and untie it and take it, to a thunderous applause by the spectators. This will be followed by visits to his house by fellow kinsmen with food and wine for elevating the status of his village. Each year this is used to commemorate the person in Arondizuogu and neighbouring towns with the strongest juju or voodoo power.

Calabar Carnival

The Calabar Carnival has been held in Calabar since 2006, including band competitions, a parade, food and dancing. It has been called Nigeria's biggest street party.
The carnival may have as many as 50,000 costumed participants and 2 million spectators, and is broadcast on television across the country. It is the culmination of the month-long Calabar festival.

The Calabar Carnival holds at the end of the year in Nigeria, and in keeping with tradition, carnival teams march across the streets where they engage in colorful displays and competitions from which winners are selected and awarded. Participating teams usually rehearse for months in advance before the carnival date itself.

Carniriv

The Carniriv is an annual festival, held in Port Harcourt, Nigeria. The Carnival starts few weeks before Christmas, and lasts for seven days. During this time several ceremonial events are held, most of which hold some cultural and or sacred significance. The Port Harcourt Carnival bears a certain uniqueness as it combines two carnivals - a purely cultural carnival and a contemporary Caribbean style carnival- in one. This gives it an edge over all other regional and continental carnivals, and presents with the principal advantage which must be consummately exploited. The Government of Rivers State recognizes Carniriv as its biggest tourism export. With economic interests increasingly identifying tourism as a viable alternative to the fossil fuel economy–especially in these parts–the state government has exhibited its commitment to developing this carnival into a regionally unrivalled and globally reckoned tourist attraction. Thus, it has always made available the necessary monetary backing needed for the event to hold every year, and has also worked hard through the Ministry of Culture and Tourism to see that it is held.

Eyo festival

The Eyo Festival is held in Lagos, Nigeria.
It is usually performed in Lagos Island.
Eyo also refers to the masquerades that come out during the festival. It is widely believed that Eyo is the forerunner of the modern day carnival in Brazil. No one is to wear hats during the festival

Olojo Festival 

The Olojo Festival is an ancient festival celebrated in Ife, Osun State, Nigeria. It is celebrated yearly. This festival is a well known festival in the Yoruba land, it was once described by Oba Adeyeye Enitan Ogunwusi as a festival that celebrate the Black race all over the world. The Yoruba word 'Olojo' means 'The Day Of The First Dawn' that describes the grateful heart of man towards God's creation and the existence of Human. The Olojo Festival is a culture festival in the calendar of the Ile-Ife, Osun State which is located in the Southwestern part of Nigeria. It is the celebration of the remembrance of “Ogun”, god of Iron, who is believed to be the first son of Oduduwa, progenitor of the Yoruba people. The festival is held annually in October.

Igbo New Yam festival 

The New Yam Festival of the Igbo people (Orureshi in the idoma area, Iwa ji, Iri ji or Ike ji, depending on dialect) is an annual cultural festival by the Igbo people held at the end of the rainy season in early August.

Igogo Festival

The Igogo Festival is an annual festival held in Ondo State, Nigeria. It is a festival that usually lasts for seventeen days in which the Olowo of Owo and high chiefs of Owo Kingdom are dressed like women to celebrate and pay homage to Queen Oronsen a mythical wife of Olowo Rerengejen in appreciation for her protection.

Nnewi Afiaolu Festival 

Afiaolu (New yam festival) is a traditional festivals held annually in Nnewi, Anambra State around August. The Afiaolu festival commences on “Eke” day with what is traditionally described as “IWAJI” (scaling of yam) and Ikpa Nku (the wood gathering), this heralds the availability of new yam as well as thanksgiving to God. The festival includes a variety of entertainments including performance of ceremonial rites by the Igwe (king), cultural dance by girls and masquerade dance.

Omabe Festival 

Omabe Festival is a special kind of festival that differs from most festivals that are celebrated annually, this Omabe festival is celebrated every five years interval. The festival is a treasure to the people of Imufu community, NSUKKA region, Ezike in Enugu state. The festival has been in existence for several centuries and meant a lot to the Imufu people as it also stand as an omen of purification and purging the community from evil. It is believed that the Masquerade bearer stands as the spiritual intermediate, and the masquerade when it comes out purges the community from evil both in human and spiritual because it is seen to appear with fire, the community has more than one masquerade, which some of them are: eshiwe, obele monwu, Oshagenyi, Eji, eshiwe, Mgbedike, mukwu monwu, Ajulaka, Agbe-Eji, Ajija, Agelle. The community is said to have about 600 masquerades. Females are not allow to come close to the masquerades as they are considered to possess mystical powers.

Ofala Festival 

The Ofala Festival also called Ofala Nnewi, is an annual ceremony practiced by the indegenes of Onitsha in Anambra State, South-East Nigeria. The term ofala (English: authority of the land) is derived from two Igbo words - ofo (English: authority) and ala (English: land). The festival which is described as the most important surviving traditional ceremony of Onitsha indigenes is celebrated within two days mostly in December and January in honour of the Obi (English: king). Ofala festival can be traced back to 16th century, which mean 'Authority of the land' and is one of the most popular festival in igbos land. The king(Obi) during the festival come out three times to address the people and to performed so ritual which is led by the chief priest. Some historians also believe the festival is associated to the New Yam Festival in Onitsha and devotion of the king to the safety of his people.

Osun festival
Main Article: Osun festival

The Osun Festival is held at the end of the rainy season, usually in August, at the Oshogbo Sacred Forest.
The week-long festival is held in honour of the river goddess Osun, an important Yoruba deity, and is attended by thousands of people. It includes ceremonies where priests seek protection for their local communities through gifts and sacrifices to the goddess. The festival is believed to signify a traditional cleansing of the city of Oshogbo which is regarded as one of UNESCOs heritage sites by the Priest and the festival always witness a huge turn of spectators and individuals from all works of life who come together to perform the cleansing which is known as "Iwopopo" by the locals.

Sango festival

Sango Festival, also known as World Sango Festival is usually held in August at the palace of the Alaafin of Oyo. The festival which is observed in over forty countries in the world is held in honor of Sango, the thunder and fire deity.

The celebration of the Sango festival could be dated as far back as 1,000 years ago following the departure of Sango, a popular Yoruba Òrìşà who is widely regarded as the founding father of present-day Oyo State.

The one week festival was renamed in 2013, and is usually held in August and it attracts over 20,000 attendees around the globe including Brazil, Cuba, Trinidad and Tobago and the Caribbean.

Sharo / Shadi Festival

The Sharo or Shadi flogging competition is a traditional rite of passage for Jafun Fulani men.
The youths, escorted by girls, are led into the ring of spectators bare chested and armed with whips.
As the noise of singing, drumming and cheering rises to a crescendo, each young man must stoically endure a flogging to demonstrate his manhood.
The young man only qualifies to marry if he passes the test, which is administered by another youth of about the same age and size. Most do pass, but carry scars from the ordeal for the rest of their life. 
The sharo is generally staged at the time of the dry-season guinea corn harvest, and again during the festival of Id-el-kabir.  Usually it lasts for a week and is held in a marketplace.
There are other tyes of entertainment including dances, musical performances and tricksters, but the flogging ceremony is the main event.

Yam Festivals

Yam Festivals are popular holiday in Nigeria, usually held in the beginning of August at the end of the rainy season. It is named after yams, the most common food in many African countries. In Nigeria, dancers wear masks that reflect the seasons or other aspects of nature.
People offer yams to gods and ancestors before distributing them to the villagers to give thanks to the spirits above them.
Leboku is the name for the annual New Yam Festival celebrated in Ugep, Nigeria, one of the five settlements of Yakurr,
to honor of the earth goddess and the ancestral spirits of the land.
The Iriji-Mmanwu festival is held in Enugu state in August.
At the festival, over two thousand masqueraders from across Igboland and from other states in Nigeria dance and give acrobatic displays, wearing unique and colorful costumes. In the Igbo tradition, masquerades are thought to be reincarnated dead ancestors, with supernatural powers.

Ogun Festival

Ogun Festival is an annual festival observed by the Yoruba people of Ondo State, Nigeria in honour of Ogun, a warrior and powerful spirit of metal work believed by the Yoruba to be the first god to arrive the earth.

The preparation of this festival usually begins seventeen days before the day. The sighting of the new moon is announced by the chief priest through the use of the upe (local trumpet) for seven days. This sighting must take place before the beginning the festival.

The festival reaches a frenzy during the last three days. The dog which is the main centre of the festival is slaughtered on the first of these days. Two people moving in opposite directions pull the dog towards themselves hence forcing it to a slow and painful death.

Ito Ogbo Festival 

The Ito-Ogbo Obosi festival is an agelong festival that dates back to over four hundred years. It is particular to the people of Obosi Kingdom in Anambra state, Nigeria. It is particularly aimed at celebrating and thanking God for the octogenarians in the kingdom.

During the ceremony which holds every three years, both male and female octogenarians are honored with special titles and inducted into the octogenarians age grade. The festival has helped to harness and develop the tourism potentials of the Obosi Kingdom as it has attracted people from all walks of life.

Ariginya Festival 

Ariginya Festival is a festival celebrated in one of the Ondo state town called Ikare Akoko. Depending on the dialect and mode of pronunciation, some call it Aringinya. This festival is said to be one of the foremost traditional festival celebrated in this town from inception. Ikare-Akoko is one of the town located in the southwest region of Nigeria, and in the Yoruba area. The festival is one out of many festivals that is set to celebrate the virginity and chastity among female genders as the Yoruba land is known for her worth and high value pertaining to decency and purity. The festival is such that helps to improve the mindset of dignity and purity as well as the value of a woman staying pure and reserved until the wedding and only to her husband. This has helped to improve the rate of decency in the town as young girls understands the price and the worth and that one of the greatest virtue of a woman is her virginity and a media to stand against sexual abuse.

Tiger Street Food Festival 

The Tiger Street Food Festival was developed out of the need to support the love of food, music, art and entrepreneurs in the street food business whilst celebrating the various flavours of the Tiger style through specially curated street food experiences over cold bottles  of Tiger beer.

During the festival there is abundance of food provided by different food vendors. Also Top Nigerian artistes are invited to the festival to add entertainment to the atmosphere that is already filled with lots of street food and refreshments. And the art displays during the festivals are usually street art such as graffiti art.

Annang Festival of Arts and Culture 

The Annage Festival of Art and Culture began in 2016, usually celebrated  by the Ikot Ekpene people of Akwa Ibom, a region located in South Southern Nigeria. They first edition was sponsored by Annang Heritage Preservation Inc. (AHPI). It is usually celebrated in the entire 8 local government area that make up Annang clan.

The festival was initiated in 2016, in order to preserve the Anaañ history, language and culture. The festival aims at preventing the Annang tradition and its cultural heritage from undergoing extinction. It showcase and promote the rich natural endowments of Annang land in Akwa Ibom State. The 2019 edition of the Annang Festival of Arts and Culture was tagged: "Harnessing Annang Cultural Assets for Economic Gain".

Imo Awka Festival 

The Imo Awka Festival is a festival celebrated annually by the people of Awka kingdom in the month of May in order to venerate their gods. They celebrate the festival in appreciation of the Imoka god, for her favours and to request for much better years ahead. Imo-Oka shrine is symbolic and it is denoted by the special white-bellied monkey, widely respected and revered as the messengers of the shrine.

The Imo Awka festival is an ancient cultural event that came from the worship of the greatest male god revered in Awka, known to be Imoka deity. The Imo Awka festival is a two weeks events that commence with the females paying homage to Imoka, dancing the Opu Eke dance.

Ovia-Osese Festival 

The Ovia-Osese Festival is a yearly celebrated festival by the Ogori's. This town is located in the Ogori-Magongo local government area of Kogi state, Nigeria. They share boundaries with Edo state and the Yoruba's. The town holds the Ovia-Osese festival annually to initiate young girls within 15 and above into adulthood or so called womanhood. This initiation is done for young girls who have maintained and kept themselves over the years who preserved their virginity. The rite is done so as to promote the quality of purity, sanctity, abstinence, and the untouched physical and emotional state of young girls and to promote self-restrain and sexual discipline among young adolescents. This celebration intends to encourage the young girls to keep themselves from pre-marital affairs. The Ogori's festival is internationally recognized as a rich cultural event.

New Yam Festivals in Nigeria 

Yam is a staple food in the West Africa and other regions classified as a Tuber crop and it is a annual or perennial crop. It is known to have many species and with a general botanical name of the family of Dioscorea Species. Yam is considered as one of the major or the most important crops in Nigeria from the olden days till date as it is grown in mostly all the states, and whoever in a community has a barn of Yam is listed among the wealthy sets of people in the community. Yam is counted to be more than food and very well respected in Nigeria and one of the major food accepted as bride price when a man is seeking for a woman hand in marriage. The festival is mostly celebrated among the Igbo people due to different spiritual ideology surrounding Yam from ancestors story passed on till today to them. New Yam Festival is celebrated annually since some or most of the common Yams are annual crops, though sometimes treated as perennial crops due to its life-cycle, the festival which hold yearly to celebrate the end and beginning of a new season. Also, it is said to be a taboo to eat the new Yam before the celebration as it is a means of pleasing and appeal to the gods and spirit of harvest and god of the Earth and thanking them for bountiful harvest, this way the god is happy and will bring more good harvest in the new season.

Cities/Towns that celebrate New Yam Festival 
Igbo Community

Okpe Kingdom

Abuja City

Ekinrin-Adde Community

Ekinrin-Adde Community

Egiland

Ado Ekiti

Ikere Ekiti

Ojude Oba Festival 

The Ojude Oba Festival is an ancient festival celebrated by the Muslim people of Ijebu Ode, a town in Ogun State, Southwestern Nigeria. The festival which takes place annually is usually witnessed on the third day after Eid al-Kabir (Ileya), to pay homage and show respect to the Royal Majesty, the Awujale of Ijebuland. It is one of the most spiritual and glamorous festivals celebrated in Ijebuland and generally in Ogun State as a whole.

It is a one-day festival where different cultural age groups known as regberegbe, indigenes, their friends, and associates far and near parades at the front of the king's palace on the third day of Eid al Kabir festival popularly referred to as "Ileya" in Yoruba language. Oba Adetona was the one that brought back the age groups in the 18th century.

References

Nigerian culture
 
 
 
 L
 Festivals
 Festivals
Nigeria